This is a list of museums within the cities of Northern Cyprus.

References

External links
 Distinctive-properties-ltd.com
 Cypnet.co.uk
 Northcyprusonline.com

Northern Cyprus
Northern Cyprus-related lists
Northern Cyprus

Lists of organisations based in Northern Cyprus